Morphy Lake State Park is a state park of New Mexico, United States, located  southwest of Mora in the Sangre de Cristo Mountains.

The park is popular for fishing, camping, and picnicking, However there is no running water, so visitors must pack their own. The lake is stocked with trout, and kokanee salmon. Boats are allowed on the lake, but no gas powered motors are allowed. Its high altitude (8,000 ft) and location in northern New Mexico cause the lake to freeze over in the winter, allowing ice fishing to take place.

References

External links
 Morphy Lake State Park

State parks of New Mexico
Parks in Mora County, New Mexico
Protected areas established in 1965
Lakes of New Mexico
1965 establishments in New Mexico